The Execution of the Comuneros of Castile is a history painting by Antonio Gisbert.

Gisbert painted the oil on canvas in Rome. He presented the painting to the 1860 National Exhibition of Fine Arts, where he won a first-class medal. The Congress of Deputies purchased the painting for 80,000 reales. The painting depicts the execution of the three leaders of the Revolt of the Comuneros on 24 April 1521 in Villalar. Traditionally exhibited at the Palacio de las Cortes in Madrid, the painting was temporarily moved to the seat of the Cortes of Castile and León in Valladolid in occasion of the 500th anniversary of the depicted event in 2021.

References 

1860 paintings
Paintings about death
Spanish paintings